Servicios Aéreos de los Andes is a Peruvian airline that operates both fixed-wing aircraft and rotorcraft. Founded as a charter airline in 2005, the company specializes in transporting personnel for the mining and oil and gas industries.  In 2014 the airline began offering commercial service with flights between Lima and Jauja and Cusco.

In 2012, two of the company's helicopters were destroyed in an attack by the Sendero Luminoso at the Camisea Gas Project in Peru.

Fleet

The Servicios Aéreos de los Andes fleet consists of the following aircraft (as of September 2020):

Other aircraft operated by the airline include the following helicopters:
 2 Eurocopter AS332 Super Puma 
 3 Eurocopter AS350 Écureuil
 Bell 412 
 Bell 205 
 Bell 212

References

External links

Official website

Airlines of Peru